Les Is More is the third studio album by R&B singer-songwriter and producer Ryan Leslie, it was released on October 22, 2012. The album features a guest appearance from Fabolous. Another version of "Swiss Francs" (Remix) with French rapper Booba is present on the European album.

Track listing

Personnel
Ryan Leslie - vocals, all keyboards, drum programming, recording, mixing
Jermaine Parrish - drums on "Glory"
DeWayne "DW" Wright - bass on "Glory" and "Joan of Arc"
Chris Morgan - guitar on "Glory", "Dress You to Undress You" and "Joan of Arc"
Gabriel Lambirth - guitar on "Lovers & Mountains"
Rico Beats - drum programming on "Joan of Arc"
Travis Sayles - keyboards on "Glory"
Pawel Szarjeko, Anthony Palazzole, Will Hensley, Moses Gallart, Anthony Cruz - recording and mixing
Chris Athens - mastering
Armen Djerrahian, Evan Rogers, Getm Jaf - photography
Grandarmy - art direction and design
Armen Djerrahian, Evan Rogers, Getm Jaf, Alex Bittan & Brian Gregory - visual media
Adam Meyer, Yamill Vallecillo - Digital Media & Application Development

Charts

References

2012 albums
Albums produced by Ryan Leslie
Ryan Leslie albums
Albums produced by Cardiak